The Martini Henry Rifles were a British noise-punk band based in Cardiff, Wales.

Influences and genre classification
Most of their quoted influences are noise and punk (most noticeably Brainiac, whose influence is clear in the Martinis' work), hence the most common noise-punk genre classification. The band never put any kind of genre label on its work, while on the other hand some people just choose to describe its sound as "chaotic", mostly derived from very energetic live performances.

History of the band
In late 2000, Cez Mathias and Jason Lorch advertised in a record shop to find musicians. Chris Warlow responded and some months later "Fudge" Wilson joined to complete the line-up. They started by using the name Luxinterior until April 2001, when The Martini Henry Rifles was finally chosen.

In November 2001, they released the limited edition single "Kill"/"Summer"/"Shit". It attracted the attention of Sean McClusky, who released the Martinis' subsequent "Luger 6000" single and became their manager. The band appeared on McClusky's Sonic Mook Experiment compilation Future Rock & Roll.

In 2003, they signed with the independent label FF Vinyl. Reportedly, the band refused to sign the contract unless it was to be done in a strip club or somewhere similar. The place chosen was a lapdancing club called Fantasy Lounge.  In December 2003, they released the single "And Then We Hit A Truck", just before taking on a break to record their first album.

In November 2004, after almost a year of recording and remixing, Superbastard was released. After finishing the album, Lorch, the drummer, left the band to emigrate to Australia and pursue other interests, and they began using a drum machine as a replacement.

During most of 2005 they toured the UK and Europe and in the first few months of 2006 recorded and prepared the release of a second album. Their final EP, Infomercial, was released on FF Vinyl Records at the start of 2006.

In late April 2006, the members informed fans on their MySpace website that they had decided to put an end to the band. No reasons were given.

Wilson now plays bass guitar in Exit International, which ha toured the UK extensively as well as touring in Europe and Japan. He is the owner of Sound Space Studios in Cardiff and works as a sound engineer and producer. Warlow is a member of The Milk Race and regularly plays all over the UK. Wilson often appears with the Milk Race to play additional guitar for their live shows.

Band members
2000 - 2004:
Jason Lorch (drums).
Chris Warlow (vocals/guitar/synthesizer)
Cez Mathias (vocals/guitar/drum machine)
Fudge Wilson (bass guitar)

2004 - 2006:
Chris Warlow (vocals/guitar/synthesizer)
Cez Mathias (vocals/guitar/drum machine)
Fudge Wilson (bass guitar)

References

External links
MySpace page & blog of the band

Welsh punk rock groups
British musical trios
Musical groups from Cardiff
Welsh noise rock groups